The Austin Fourteen is a 1.7-litre saloon that was introduced by Austin in August 1936 and available as a Goodwood saloon—with a fixed or sliding head—or as a Goodwood cabriolet.  The body was of steel throughout. Nominally classed by Austin as a Fourteen the actual engine size attracted tax for a 16 horsepower car. The performance of the engine carried over from the Light Twelve-Six proved disappointing and a much smoother revised version with a near 20% improvement in power output was introduced the next year.

Equipment
The car was supplied with an adjustable steering column and body insulation. It comfortably carried four passengers with room for a small fifth passenger in the centre of the back seat. Even the quarter-lights were supplied with blinds, there were flush fitting footrests in the back of the large, adjustable, front seats with pull straps above. The back floor was flat except for the somewhat pronounced propeller shaft tunnel. The boot was provided with a fitted suitcase, the spare wheel sitting horizontally in the space below. The door could be let down and used as a luggage platform.

Chassis
The monopiece steel roof, doors and floors were insulated against heat and noise. The frame had cruciform centre bracing and its cross members were reversed to form box sections with the side members.

Engine clutch and gearbox were insulated as one assembly from the chassis by live rubber, there being two suspension points in front and one at the back of the gearbox. Silencer and exhaust system were insulated from the chassis by rubber mounting.

Suspension
Half-elliptical zinc interleaved  springs were fitted with self-lubricating discs and controlled by hydraulic shock absorbers. In front the springs were shackled forward  and were flat, the back springs underhung.

Brakes
Brakes by Girling were of the wedge and roller mechanically operated type and the four were worked by hand or foot.

Steering
Steering was by hour-glass worm and sector.

Road Test
The Times' correspondent reported that the engine felt sturdy and willing but that refinement and brilliance were "not its strong points". The extra low pressure tyres allowed lightness and sway at speed he said but the car held the road satisfactorily and 65 miles an hour proved a comfortable maximum speed.

Revision
Eight months after the road test was published The Times felt able to report that the Austin Fourteen was now a much improved car.

Engine
The engine had been given a new cylinder head, larger downdraught carburettor, larger inlet valves and a higher compression ratio. Power output had moved up from 38.7 bhp at 3,800 rpm to 46 bhp at 4,000 rpm, an increase of near 20%.

1939
Now supplied with an improved engine  mounting, new pistol grip handbrake, shock absorbers, lubricated road springs and given, like the Twelve, higher and wider doors and a longer bonnet.

References

14
1930s cars
Cars introduced in 1936